Bigger Picture Music Group, formerly Big Picture Music Group, was an independent record label based in Nashville, Tennessee founded in 2008. It is distributed by Atlantic Records in the US. Their main focus is in country music. Their artist roster included such artists as Chris Cagle, Craig Campbell, Alice Cooper, The Harters, Christian Kane, and Zac Brown Band.

The label closed in May 2014.

Former artists
Chelsea Bain
Blackjack Billy
Rachel Bradshaw
Chris Cagle
Craig Campbell
The Harters
Chris Janson
Christian Kane
Ryan Kinder
Smithfield
D. Vincent Williams

Former service clients
Paul Brandt
Sonia Leigh
Alice Cooper
Christian Kane
Uncle Kracker
Ronnie Milsap
Zac Brown Band

References

External links
Official website

American country music record labels
American independent record labels
Atlantic Records
Record labels established in 2008
Record labels disestablished in 2014